The 2011 West Asian Football Federation Women's Championship tournament was held from 3 to 12 October 2011 in  Abu Dhabi, United Arab Emirates. It was the fourth West Asian Football Federation Women's Championship held.

The UAE successfully defended their title by beating Iran in the final.

Draw
Eight teams entered the tournament and were drawn into two groups of four nations. The draw for the competition was made on 2 October 2011.

Group stage
All times given as local time (UTC+3)

Group A

Group B

Knockout stage

Semi-finals

Third-place match

Final

Goalscorers
13 goals

  Reem Al Hashmi

8 goals

  Maryam Rahimi

7 goals

  Maysa Jbarah

6 goals

  Djamila Marek

5 goals

  Dalila Zerrouki

4 goals

  Alanood Al Khalifa

3 goals

  Sara Ghomi
  Ayah Al-Majali

2 goals

  Deena Abdelrahman
  Marwa Mohammad
  Nasimeh Gholami
  Fereshteh Karimi
  Meysam Soleimani
  Stephanie Alnaber
  Walaa Huessin
  Ouafae Nacha
  Imen Troudi

1 goal

  Manar Yaaqob
  Niloofar Ardallani
  Fatemeh Arzhangi
  Zahra Ghanbari
  Abeer Alnahar
  Lara Dihmis
  Shahnaz Jebreen
  Mai Sweilem
  Nadia Assaf
  Ghinwa Saleh
  Kiloudi Salama
  Caroline Sohagian
  Amneh Alshater
  Sara Hassanin
  Oumayma Maaouia
  Sabrine Mamay

1 own goal

 (playing against Iran)

References

External links
 RSSSF tournament results
 Official website

WAFF Women's Championship
WAFF
West
2011
WAFF